Billy Reyne Tidwell (August 3, 1930 – December 19, 1990) was American football player and coach.  Tidwell was drafted in the third round of the 1952 NFL Draft by the San Francisco 49ers. He served as the head football coach at Sam Houston State University from 1974 to 1977, compiling a record of 11–30–1.

Head coaching record

References

External links
 
 Sports-Reference profile
 

1930 births
1990 deaths
American football halfbacks
Sam Houston Bearkats athletic directors
Sam Houston Bearkats football coaches
San Francisco 49ers players
Texas A&M Aggies football players
People from Hearne, Texas
Coaches of American football from Texas
Players of American football from Texas